Joseph Caspar (born 1799 in Rorschach, Switzerland; died 1880) was a Swiss painter and engraver.

When Caspar was 16 he went to Rome and studied there by copying the works of old masters. Following Wilhelm von Schadow's advise Caspar went to Berlin in 1820. In Berlin he settled down as a freelance artist.

The privy council of Beuth (German: Geheimrat von Beuth) advised him to specialize in the copper engraving and supported him financially. Therefore, Caspar could be Giuseppe Longhi’s and Pietro Anderloni’s student for about four years in Milan.

In 1826 Caspar returned to Berlin Soon he was appointed as a librarian of the Berlin University of the Arts.

Works (Sample)

 Saint Barbara (after Giovanni Antonio Beltraffio)
 Thomas von Savoyen (after Anthony van Dyck)
 Saint Antonius (after Bartolomé Esteban Murillo)
 Nine muses (after Karl Wilhelm Wach)

References
This article was initially translated from the German Wikipedia.

19th-century Swiss painters
Swiss male painters
1799 births
1847 deaths
People from Rorschach, Switzerland
19th-century Swiss male artists